Hong Kong is one of the healthiest places in the world. Because of its early health education, professional health services, and well-developed health care and medication system, Hongkongers enjoy a life expectancy of 86 for females and 80 for men, which is the third highest in the world, and an infant mortality rate of 2.73 deaths per 1,000 births, the ninth-lowest in the world.  The proportion of the population over 65 years old is expected to grow from 14% in 2013 to 18% in 2018, and the number of people with a long-term condition is expected to increase by 33% over the same period.

Mental health appears to be more of a problem than physical health.  It is reported that the number of mental health patients has increased by 2% to 4% every year since 2011 from 187,000 in 2011–12 to 226,000 in 2015–16.  Pressure on children from the competitive education system and high parental expectations is blamed for rising levels of anxiety and depression in young children. Primary school children are reported to spend less time outdoors playing than convicted prisoners.

The Secretary for Health is responsible for formulating and implementing health policies of Hong Kong and is in charge of the Health Bureau. The Bureau oversees the operations of the Department of Health. Public hospital service is provided by the Hospital Authority.

Department of Health

The Department of Health, under the Health Bureau, is the health adviser of Hong Kong government and an executive arm in health legislation and policy. Its main role is to safeguard the health of the community through promotive, preventive, curative and rehabilitative services in Hong Kong. The main function of the department includes child assessment service, immunisation programmes, dental service, forensic pathology service, registration of healthcare professionals etc., though boards and councils (i.e. Medical Council of Hong Kong, Pharmacy and Poisons Board of Hong Kong) are independent statutory bodies established under the relevant ordinances that operate independently to discharge their statutory functions.

Medical Institutions
There are two medical training faculties established in Hong Kong. They are the Li Ka Shing Faculty of Medicine of the University of Hong Kong and the Faculty of Medicine of the Chinese University of Hong Kong.

See also
Immunisation Programme in Hong Kong
Healthcare in Hong Kong
Health Info World
Hong Kong Society of Medical Informatics
Hong Kong Museum of Medical Sciences
Personal Emergency Link
Air Pollution Index
Smoking in Hong Kong

References